Millbank Tower is a  high skyscraper in the City of Westminster at Millbank, by the River Thames in London. The tower was constructed in 1963, and has been home to many high-profile political organisations, including the Labour and Conservative parties, and the United Nations.

History
The tower was constructed in 1963 for Vickers and was therefore originally known as Vickers House or the Vickers Tower. It was designed by Ronald Ward and Partners and built by John Mowlem & Co. It is a landmark on the London skyline, standing beside the River Thames, half a mile upstream from the Palace of Westminster. The tower has been owned by David and Simon Reuben since 2002, while still being managed by its former owner Tishman Speyer Properties.  It is a Grade II listed building.
Until the BT Tower's completion in 1964, Millbank Tower was the tallest building in the United Kingdom.
The 2003 edition of the Pevsner architectural guide says that the Millbank Tower is "one of the few London office towers to have won affection", and contrasts it with the "boxy structure" of the Shell Tower at Waterloo.

In 2010 the building was surrounded and occupied by thousands of student protesters who spontaneously branched off from a demonstration called by the National Union of Students, which was campaigning against the Coalition government's increase of tuition fees - Millbank was the location of Conservative Campaign Headquarters at the time. The demonstration and occupation helped spawn further student protests that year.

Occupants
The Millbank Tower has been home to many high-profile political and other organisations. From 1994 to 2002 the Labour Party rented two floors in the base at the south of the site, for use as a general election campaign centre. Labour ran its 1997 General Election campaign from these offices; after the election, the party vacated its headquarters at John Smith House, Walworth Road SE17, to move to Millbank. Five years later, the £1 million per annum rent forced the party to vacate the tower and take out a mortgage of £5.5 million to relocate to 16-18 Old Queen Street, overlooking St James's Park, which had 11,200 square feet of open plan premises.

The United Nations also had offices in the tower, but moved out in June 2003, also citing high rents. Other public bodies have continued to occupy the building, including the Central Statistical Office, the predecessor of the Office for National Statistics; the Parliamentary and Health Service Ombudsman; the Local Government Ombudsman; the UK India Business Council; and the Ministry of Justice Records Management Service.

Between 2006 and 2014, the Conservative Party based its campaign headquarters at 30 Millbank, in the same complex as Millbank Tower.

Other floors in the tower are occupied by organisations and commercial companies, including the Environment Agency, the World Bank, Altitude 360 London, foreign exchange specialists World First, the Specialist Schools and Academies Trust, the UK India Business Council, the London office of Medopad, Canonical Ltd, the Audit Commission, event caterers Salt and Pepper, Private Food Design, the firm Lewis PR, the London office of the Open Society Foundations, the Local Government Boundary Commission for England, XLN Telecom and Leave.EU.

The building also housed the studios for RT UK prior to its closure in 2022.

Since April 2018, the central People's Vote office has been based in the tower.

In popular culture
The tower featured in the 1973 film, The Vault of Horror, in which several characters are trapped in a lift in the building. It was also used for the location filming of the Doctor Who serials The Invasion (as the London offices of International Electromatics) and Terror of the Zygons (as the venue for the World Energy Conference). The tower also featured in The Persuaders! episode "Someone Like Me" (1971), in which Danny Wilde (Tony Curtis) is seen going into the building to stop Lord Brett Sinclair (Sir Roger Moore) who has been programmed to shoot his friend Sam Milford (Bernard Lee).

Future
In 2016, the Reuben brothers made a successful application to redevelop the building, notwithstanding its listed status, and convert it into a hotel and luxury apartments.

Gallery

References

Office buildings completed in 1963
Skyscrapers in the City of Westminster
Headquarters of political parties
Reuben Brothers
Television studios in London
Millbank
Grade II listed buildings in the City of Westminster
Skyscraper hotels in London
Skyscraper office buildings in London
Residential skyscrapers in London